Radoslav "Rale" Milenković (born 17 February 1958) is a Serbian actor and theatre director. He has won the most prestigious awards for acting and directing at many festivals in Serbia and formerly SFR Yugoslavia.

Milenković was born in Novi Sad, SR Serbia, SFR Yugoslavia. He has graduated from the University of Novi Sad Academy of Arts in the class of Branko Pleša. He later graduated theatre director studies at the University of Arts School of Dramatic Arts in the class of Dejan Mijač. He was a member of Yugoslav Drama Theatre from 1987 to 2005. Since then, he is a prominent drama director of the Serbian National Theatre.

References

External links
 
 
 Radoslav Milenković at port.rs
 Interview at pressonline.rs
 Interview at blic.rs
 Plavi krug - Radoslav Rale Milenkovic at youtube.com

1958 births
Living people
Serbian male actors
Actors from Novi Sad
University of Belgrade Faculty of Dramatic Arts alumni